The 1962–63 IHL season was the 18th season of the International Hockey League, a North American minor professional league. Six teams participated in the regular season, and the Fort Wayne Komets won the Turner Cup.

Regular season

Turner Cup-Playoffs

External links
 Season 1962/63 on hockeydb.com

IHL
International Hockey League (1945–2001) seasons